

See also
 Lists of video games
 List of turn-based tactics video games
 List of real-time tactics video games

fr:Liste chronologique des tacticals RPG